Pavel is an Indian film director and screenplay writer who primarily works in Bengali-language films.
He made his debut with the film Babar Naam Gandhiji, which was followed by Rosogolla. His next film, Asur, was released on 3 January 2020,  with Jeet, Abir Chatterjee and Nusrat Jahan.

He has also worked as an illustrator of book covers and has illustrated books by Nabarun Bhattacharya; Bhattacharjee made a documentary about Nabarun after his death titled Poet from Death Valley.

Early life
He has attended Kalighat High school & Mukul Bose memorial institution for schooling and went to Calcutta University for Bechalor's and master's degree in history. Besides studying in school, he was a very active participant in recitation, debate, quiz and drama.

Filmography

References

Bengali film directors
Bengali screenwriters
Indian film directors
Indian screenwriters
Living people
Year of birth missing (living people)
Film directors from Kolkata